Melvyn Peter Kevin Cheskin (born 1942), is a male former athlete who competed for England.

Athletics career
Cheskin was selected by England to represent his country in Athletics events. He represented England in the 220 yards and sprint relay, at the 1966 British Empire and Commonwealth Games in Kingston, Jamaica.

In addition he competed at the 1966 European Athletics Championships in Budapest.

References

1942 births
English male sprinters
Athletes (track and field) at the 1966 British Empire and Commonwealth Games
Living people
Commonwealth Games competitors for England